Daniel "Danny" Seaman (born 1961) is an Israeli media professional and former civil servant, mainly active in the fields of foreign service and public diplomacy.

Seaman worked in the Israeli civil service for 31 years (1983-2014) and is currently English language editor at Mida, an online conservative Israeli current affairs and opinion magazine. Between 2000-2010, he served as the director of the Israeli Government Press Office (GPO), part of the Prime Minister's Office in Jerusalem responsible for the foreign media contingent in Israel. His last public position was Deputy Director General for Information at the Israeli Ministry of Public Diplomacy and Diaspora Affairs where his outspoken views were often seen as controversial. In August 2013, Seaman was suspended from his government position as Director of Interactive Media because of comments he made in a private Facebook posting about Japanese commemorating the bombing of Hiroshima and Nagasaki and Palestinians commemorating the Nakba.

Seaman was the bureau chief of Voice of Israel, a private Israeli English-language news and talk internet radio station that existed from 2014 to 2015. Seaman hosted In The Lions' Den with Daniel Seaman and Daniela Traub interviewing such guests as Dr. Einat Wilf, Zvi Yehezkeli, Ehud Gol, Col. Richard Kemp, Dr. Joy Browne, Bassem Eid and other political and media figures.

Biography

Seaman was born on a US Air Force base in Germany, the son of an American father and a mother born in Israel. His family moved from the United States to Israel in 1971 and settled in the port city of Ashkelon.

He enlisted in the Israel Defense Forces serving in an elite paratroop unit in 1979 and is a veteran of the 1982 Lebanon War.

Between 1983 and 1989 he was employed by the Israeli consulate in New York City. While there he completed a BA in political science, with honors, at the City University of New York's Hunter College.

Seaman served as an adviser and spokesperson to the governments of six prime ministers: Yitzhak Shamir, Shimon Peres, Yitzhak Rabin, Benjamin Netanyahu, and Ehud Barak.

Seaman was directly responsible for coordinating the press coverage of several heads of states visits to Israel including US President Bill Clinton, British prime minister Tony Blair, Canadian prime minister Jean Chrétien, Australian prime minister John Howard, Jordan's King Hussein and Chinese president Jiang Zemin. He was a member of the Israeli press delegation to the Aqaba peace talks (see Road map for peace, Red Sea Summit in Aqaba, Jordan, June 4, 2003). Seaman received the Israel Outstanding Civil Service Award in 2000 for coordinating the international press coverage of Pope John Paul II's visit to the Holy Land in March 2000.

Seaman was appointed as acting director of the Government Press Office (GPO) in December 2000 and worked with thousands of foreign journalists who covered news events in Israel and the Palestinian territories until 2010. He had worked for the GPO for several years and was the first civil servant promoted to directorship of the GPO after a period of 30 years. During his tenure as GPO director he implemented several measures that improved working conditions for foreign journalists in Israel. This notwithstanding, there were numerous complaints about his treatment of journalists unsympathetic to Israeli policies (see Controversies below).

He took a leave of absence from his post in November 2008 and announced his candidacy in the Likud party primaries for the 18th Knesset, but withdrew his candidacy.

Seaman lectures on Israeli and Middle-Eastern affairs and appeared on dozens of international news media outlets.

Views and opinions
Seaman is said to have observed the a dramatic intensification of public diplomacy in coverage of the Israeli-Palestinian conflict, what interviewers have called "cognitive warfare" waged in a "battlefront of perceptions", in which Israel must handle a "global media battle". Israel is, he adds, suffering "strategic damage" from this area. In this, he sees the media as "agenda-driven" concerning the Palestinian narrative and Palestinian society highly mobilized, and these two elements cause Israel's image to suffer in international reportage. The problem is, he argues, that the Arab world fails to maintain journalistic standards accepted in the West, and in waging their media war insult the free press tradition which, he affirms, Israel upholds. Critics claim that his demand for stricter standards is damaging media relations.

Regarding journalists involved in covering the conflict he has stated:

I don't work with journalists directly anymore and it's a huge relief. They disregard the laws of the country, they don't respect boundaries in Israel in ways they wouldn't dare in other countries.  . They're insulted when they have to go through regular security checks like everyone else .. and sometimes the journalists knowingly assist enemies of the state.

Journalists must prove their credentials. Activists, he says, should not be described as something they are not, journalists.  Israelis when hurt return to a normal life quickly, whereas Palestinians exploit their tragedies as weapons in a media battle. The effect is to impress world opinion with the idea that Palestinians suffer more than do Israelis. The Israeli media also have problems, with, he calculates, 90% of media reflecting what is only 5% of Israeli public opinion. He is critical of the vocal exposure of the multiplicity of voices in Israel in lieu of a "centralization across all sectors" that would permit Israel to  deploy a formidable "unified force of opinion".

In Operation Cast Lead, Israel blocked foreign journalists from entering the Gaza Strip to report on the war. This raised an outcry of protest, with UNWRA claiming that failure of access by journalists hindered a truthful representation of what was occurring. The reason given by the Israeli government for its ban was that international correspondents would be endangered there, and that to protect them, Israel would have to divert resources towards their protection better spent on fighting Hamas. Seaman was quoted on CNN as saying that Israel had learnt a lesson  from  its war with Hezbollah in Lebanon earlier in 2006:'There was too much exposure, it had an effect on our ability to achieve strategic goals', a declaration taken to indicate the real rationale behind the government's ban. Seaman was also quoted by The New York Times Ethan Bronner as arguing: 'Any journalist who enters Gaza becomes a fig leaf and front for the Hamas terror organization, and I see no reason we should help that.' The Goldstone Report on the war added that Seaman also expressed the view that foreign correspondents lacked professionalism and took "questionable reports at face  value without checking".

In May 2018, during an interview to the Israeli news channel i24 News Seaman stated that "I am an Islamophobe. Because we have lived here long enough to know what they are capable of doing".

Controversies

Conflicts with journalists
As the director of the GPO, Seaman came under criticism for not issuing journalists with Israeli press cards. Additionally, he was accused by one journalist of becoming aggressive, abusive and using foul language against journalists he considered hostile and unfair towards Israel. Such journalists included Israeli mainstream media employees such as Atta Awisat, a veteran staff photographer at Yedioth Ahronoth, then the largest newspaper in Israel, allegedly due to clearance issues with the security agencies.

Seaman did not deny using this type of policy towards blatantly anti-Israeli media outlets:

I can make journalists' lives more difficult. There are certain guidelines that allow me to do that. Such as with the case of [Swedish newspaper] Aftonbladet, and their despicable anti-Semitic [...] report on the IDF [purportedly] abducting Palestinians and using their body organs. We didn't prevent Aftonbladet from working here. We just took our time. To this day, the correspondents from Aftonbladet do not get a press card immediately. We can take up to 90 days and we can take longer...

Another journalist who became the target of Seaman's contempt was Jörg Bremer, a 15-year veteran of the press corps in Jerusalem, who worked as the correspondent of the right-liberal German Frankfurter Allgemeine Zeitung newspaper. In his case, he was denied not the renewal of his press card, but the extension of his residence visa. For calling this measure a political way of keeping unwanted journalist at bay and for asking for the German government's support, Bremer was described by Seaman in a newspaper interview as "an idiot," "a piece of shit" and "a miserable liar." Bremer said in response that "Seaman wants journalists to lick his feet. He gets enjoyment from the situation, and uses his power instead of helping. It is harmful to Israel."

On 11 March 2007, Haaretz reported that the Israeli Civil Service Commission was investigating foreign journalists' accusations that Government Press Office director Daniel Seaman has treated them improperly and enforced the procedures for receiving a press pass in an inequitable manner.

In August 2013, Haaretz accused him of having "gained a reputation for his confrontations with foreign correspondents and for the complaints they lodged against him" and called him "an abusive racist." The article, included selected quotes from Seaman's personal Facebook page. Seaman was admonished by the government, which distanced itself from his views and then suspended him from his position as Director of Interactive Media because of offensive, racist comments.

Comments against Japanese nuclear victim commemorations
I am sick of the Japanese, 'Human Rights' and 'Peace' groups the world over holding their annual self-righteous commemorations for the Hiroshima and Nagasaki victims. Hiroshima and Nagasaki were the consequence of Japanese aggression. You reap what you sow. Instead, they should be commemorating the estimated 50 million Chinese, Korean, Filipino, Malay, Vietnamese, Cambodian, Indonesian, Burmese and other victims of Japanese imperial aggression and genocide.

The statement, posted on Seaman's personal Facebook page, lead to a rebuke from the Japanese government and an official Israeli apology. Editorials in Tablet and Israel National News called Seaman's suspension over the incident "misguided."

Anti-Palestinian online postings
— The Palestinians' 65-second siren commemorating the Nakba is "not nearly enough time to stop and pause to think about how stupid they are."
	
— "Is there a diplomatic way of saying 'Go F*** yourself'?" - Facebook posting, 26 May 2013, in response to conditions for the renewal of peace talks set by Palestinian negotiator Saeb Erekat.

— Similarly, he wondered whether Muslims "stop eating each other" during Ramadan.

Media and book coverage
 Seaman is mentioned extensively in Stephanie Gutmann's book The Other War—Israelis, Palestinians and the Struggle for Media Supremacy(October 2005). Chapter 10, "His Own Private Jihad," is specifically about his efforts to curb Palestinian influence on the media coverage. 
 Media, Religion and Conflict by Heather Savigny, states, "Daniel Seaman, the Director of the Israeli Government Press Office, commenting on the international television coverage of the 2006 Israel-Hezbollah war, was quoted by CNN as saying: "There was too much exposure, it had an effect on our ability to achieve strategic goals, so that's one of the lessons we learned from the war in Lebanon." 
 Intifada: Palestine and Israel - The Long Day of Rage by David Pratt quotes Seaman as saying, Israel would not "...behave just to be liked by the Europeans or lay down and play dead. We are going to defend ourselves,' he continued. "Seaman pulled no punches and called it as he saw it, berating whatever country or organization he felt 'appeased Palestinian terrorism.' He even included the United Nations Palestinian relief agency UNWRA, accusing it of turning a blind eye to weapons stored in its food warehouses. "So I'm asking you, what are these organizations doing when they criticise Israel? All Israel is doing is defending itself..." 
 Seaman currently writes for Mida on the Arab-Israeli conflict and media bias. 
 Seaman has a regular column in Jewish News Syndicate. 
 "Danny Seaman's farewell voyage". Upon conclusion of his term as GPO director he gave an extensive interview to the editor of The Jerusalem Post, which was published on November 5, 2011.
 "Is an abusive racist the best Israeli PR can produce?" Haaretz, August 13, 2013. 
 "Bullying Israeli Government Flack Sparks Diplomatic Row—Among Other Concerns," about Seaman denying press cards to journalists and using foul language towards them. The Daily Beast, February 21, 2013.
 "Netanyahu's social media director suspended," on Seaman's suspension, blogging faux-pas and future plans. The Jerusalem Post, August 16, 2013. .

Published articles
 "Palestinian industry of lies: Media manipulation has become strategic Arab weapon against Israel" - Ynetnews, May 29, 2008 . 
 "Opposing the Digital Pogrom" - Responding to the foreign media's claim they are offended by their negative portrayal in a Ministry for Public Diplomacy's campaign. The Jerusalem Post, March 4, 2010

References

1961 births
Hunter College alumni
American emigrants to Israel
Living people
Israeli civil servants
Israeli broadcasters
Mass media in Israel
American people of Israeli descent